In mathematics and combinatorics, a centered hexagonal number, or hex number, is a centered figurate number that represents a hexagon with a dot in the center and all other dots surrounding the center dot in a hexagonal lattice. The following figures illustrate this arrangement for the first four centered hexagonal numbers:
{|style="min-width: 325px;"|
! 1 !! !! 7 !! !! 19 !! !! 37
|-  style="text-align:center; color:red; vertical-align:middle;"
| +1 || || +6 || || +12 || || +18

|-  style="vertical-align:middle; text-align:center; line-height:1.1em;"
|
|
|    
|
|              
|
|                              
|}

Centered hexagonal numbers should not be confused with cornered hexagonal numbers, which are figurate numbers in which the associated hexagons share a vertex.

The sequence of hexagonal numbers starts out as follows :

1, 7, 19, 37, 61, 91, 127, 169, 217, 271, 331, 397, 469, 547, 631, 721, 817, 919.

Formula 

The th centered hexagonal number is given by the formula

Expressing the formula as

In the opposite direction, the index  corresponding to the centered hexagonal number  can be calculated using the formula

This can be used as a test for whether a number  is centered hexagonal: it will be if and only if the above expression is an integer.

Recurrence and generating function 

The centered hexagonal numbers  satisfy the recurrence relation

From this we can calculate the generating function . The generating function satisfies

and end up at

Properties 
In base 10 one can notice that the hexagonal numbers' rightmost (least significant) digits follow the pattern 1–7–9–7–1 (repeating with period 5).
This follows from the last digit of the triangle numbers  which repeat 0-1-3-1-0 when taken modulo 5.
In base 6 the rightmost digit is always 1: 16, 116, 316, 1016, 1416, 2316, 3316, 4416...
This follows from the fact that every centered hexagonal number modulo 6 (=106) equals 1.

That is, centered hexagonal pyramidal numbers and cubes are the same numbers, but they represent different shapes. Viewed from the opposite perspective, centered hexagonal numbers are differences of two consecutive cubes, so that the centered hexagonal numbers are the gnomon of the cubes. (This can be seen geometrically from the diagram.) In particular, prime centered hexagonal numbers are cuban primes.

Applications 
Centered hexagonal numbers have practical applications in packing problems. They arise when packing round items into larger round containers, such as Vienna sausages into round cans, or combining individual wire strands into a cable.

References

See also
Hexagonal number
Magic hexagon
Star number

Figurate numbers
Integer sequences